Komsilga is a department or commune of Kadiogo Province in central Burkina Faso. The population was 53,255 in 2006.

Towns and villages
The department's capital lies at the town of Komsilga.

References

Departments of Burkina Faso
Kadiogo Province